Paul Melchers (6 January 1813 – 14 December 1895) was a Cardinal and Archbishop of Cologne. At the height of the Kulturkampf he took refuge in the Netherlands.

Life

Melchers was born in Münster. He studied law at Bonn (1830–33), and a few years practice at Münster, took up theology at Munich under Heinrich Klee, Joseph Görres, Karl Joseph Hieronymus Windischmann and Ignaz von Döllinger. Ordained in 1841, he was assigned to duty in the village of Haltern. In 1844 he became vice-rector of the diocesan seminary, rector (1851), canon of the cathedral (1852), vicar-general (1854).

Pope Pius IX appointed him Bishop of Osnabrück (1857) and Archbishop of Cologne (1866). He inaugurated (1867) at Fulda, meetings of the German bishops. He regarded the formal definition of papal infallibility as untimely, a conviction which he, with thirteen other bishops, expressed in a letter to the pope, 4 September 1869.

In the First Vatican Council Melchers took a prominent part. At the session of 13 July 1870, he voted negatively on the question of papal infallibility; but he refused to sign an address in which fifty-five other members of the minority notified the pope of their immediate departure and reiterated their non placet. He left Rome before the fourth session, giving as his reason the outbreak of the Franco-Prussian war, and declaring his readiness to abide by the decisions of the Council.

On his return to Cologne he proclaimed in an address (24 July) the dogma defined on 18 July. As a means of ensuring obedience to the Council, the bishops assembled by him in Fulda, published (1 September) a joint letter, for which Pius IX (20 October) expressed gratitude. To eliminate the opposition at Bonn, the archbishop (20 Sept. and 8 Oct.) called on professors Franz Xaver Dieringer, Franz Heinrich Reusch, Joseph Langen, and Franz Peter Knoodt to sign a declaration accepting the Vatican decree and pledging conformity thereto in their teaching. Dieringer alone complied; the others were suspended and eventually (12 March 1872) excommunicated.

The Kulturkampf was firmly resisted by Archbishop Melchers. In June, 1873, he excommunicated two priests who had joined the Old Catholics; for this and other administrative acts he was fined and imprisoned for six months (12 March–October, 1874). On 2 December 1875, the President of the Rhine Province demanded his resignation on pain of deposition; he refused, but learning that preparations were being made to deport him to Küstrin he escaped (13 December) to Maastricht and took refuge with the Franciscans. From their monastery he administered his dioceses for ten years. On different occasions he informed Pope Leo XIII of his willingness to resign for the general good. The pope at last consented, but called him to Rome, and created him cardinal (27 July 1885).

In 1892, during a serious illness he was received into the Society of Jesus and lived as a Jesuit until his death three years later in Rome. He was laid to rest in the cathedral of Cologne. St. Paul's Church, Cologne, completed in 1908, commemorates Melchers.

Works

His principal publications are: Erinnerungen an die Feier des 50jährigen Bischofsjubiläums des h. Vaters Pius IX. (Recollections on the Golden Jubilee of Pope Pius IX; Cologne, 1876); Eine Unterweisung über das Gebet (Cologne, 1876); Einer Unterweisung über des heilige Messopfer (Cologne, 1879); Das Sendschreiben des heiligen Vaters Papst Leo XIII. über den Socialismus (Cologne, 1880); Die katholische Lehre von der Kirche (Cologne, 1881); Das eine Nothwendige (Cologne, 1882); De canonica dioecesium visitatione (Rome, 1892).

References

Heinrich Maria Ludwigs, Kardinal Erzbischof Dr. Paulus Melchers und die St. Pauluskirche in Köln (Cologne, 1909)
Theodor Granderath/Konrad Kirch, Geschichte des Vatikanischen Konzils, I, II, III (Freiburg, 1903–1906)
Theodor Granderath, Acta et Decreta S. S. conciliorum recentiorum, tom. VII (Freiburg, 1890)

External links

|-

|-

1813 births
1895 deaths
People from Münster
Roman Catholic bishops of Osnabrück
Archbishops of Cologne
19th-century German cardinals
Cardinals created by Pope Leo XIII
19th-century German Jesuits
People from the Province of Westphalia
Burials at Cologne Cathedral
Jesuit cardinals
20th-century German Roman Catholic priests